Aglobi (Əğlabi) is a rural locality (a selo) in Derbentsky District, Republic of Dagestan, Russia. The population was 2,341 as of 2010. There are 31 streets.

Geography 
Aglobi is located 20 km south of Derbent (the district's administrative centre) by road. Aladash and Rubas are the nearest rural localities.

Nationalities 
Lezgins, Azerbaijanis and Tabasarans live there.

References 

Rural localities in Derbentsky District